Cyphocarpus is a genus of flowering plants in the Campanulaceae. It has been placed in its own subfamily, Cyphocarpoideae. It contains three known species, all endemic to Chile.

 Cyphocarpus innocuus Sandwith
 Cyphocarpus psammophilus Ricardi
 Cyphocarpus rigescens Miers

References

External links
Chile Flora, Image of Cyphocarpus rigescens

Campanulaceae
Campanulaceae genera
Flora of Chile